Ficus lacor is a large evergreen tree of the family Moraceae, native to Asia and Australia. It is the city tree of Chongqing. It is a good fodder species. Ceremonial, edible and fodder. Young buds (Surulo) are used in making pickles.  Seeds are tonic in nature and used in treatment of stomach disorder.

References

mavrophylla
Flora of tropical Asia
Flora of China
Flora of Eastern Asia
Flora of Australia